Thomas Garner was a leading English Gothic revival architect.

Thomas Garner may also refer to:

Thomas Garner (engraver) (1789–1868), English engraver

See also
Tom Garner (born 1961), American golfer
Thomas Gardner (disambiguation)